Bcl-2/adenovirus E1B 19 kDa-interacting protein 2-like protein is a protein that in humans is encoded by the BNIPL gene.

Interactions 

BNIPL has been shown to interact with:
 BCL2-like 1, 
 Bcl-2,
 CDC42, 
 GFER,  and
 Macrophage migration inhibitory factor.

References

External links

Further reading